Jane Randolph (née Roemer; October 30, 1914 – May 4, 2009), was an American film actress. She is best known for her portrayals of Alice Moore in the 1942 horror film Cat People, and its sequel, The Curse of the Cat People (1944). She was born in Youngstown, Ohio and died in Gstaad, Switzerland, in 2009.

Biography

Early life
Randolph was born October 30, 1914 in Youngstown, Ohio, and grew up in Kokomo, Indiana, where her hobbies included playing golf and flying airplanes. She attended DePauw University, where she was a member of Kappa Alpha Theta. She also studied at an acting school operated by Max Reinhardt.

Film career
Randolph moved to Hollywood in 1939 in an attempt to start a movie career. She was eventually picked up by Warner Bros. and appeared in bit movie roles in 1941. Her screen debut came in Manpower in 1941.
 
In 1942, RKO picked up the contract of the poised actress and she received a leading lady role in Highways by Night (1942). She became known for her roles in film noir, which included Jealousy (1945) and Railroaded! (1947), and in two of Val Lewton's now well regarded B-picture horror films, Cat People (1942) and The Curse of the Cat People (1944). Her last credited film role was Abbott and Costello Meet Frankenstein (1948).

Later life
Randolph was married to Bert D'Armand, an agent. They divorced in 1949. In 1949, Randolph married Jaime del Amo (grandson of Manuel Dominguez), retired to Spain and became a socialite. In later years she returned to Los Angeles periodically, but maintained a home in Gstaad.

The trade publication Billboard reported that Randolph and del Amo were married April 20, 1948, in Las Vegas, Nevada. An additional source says that she and Del Amo were married in Las Vegas in 1948, and that it was her second marriage.

Death
Randolph died in Gstaad from complications of a broken hip, aged 94.

Filmography

Notes

References

Sources

External links

 
 

1914 births
2009 deaths
Actresses from Indiana
American expatriates in Spain
American expatriates in Switzerland
American film actresses
People from Kokomo, Indiana
Actresses from Youngstown, Ohio
DePauw University alumni
Expatriate actors in Switzerland
20th-century American actresses
Warner Bros. contract players
RKO Pictures contract players
21st-century American women